The Confusion Range is a north-south trending mountain range in west-central Utah, United States.  It is bounded by Snake Valley to the west, Tule Valley to the east, the Great Salt Lake Desert to the north, and the Ferguson Desert to the south.  The range trends into the Burbank Hills, Mountain Home Range, and the Wah Wah Mountains to the south.  In the central part of the range, an offshoot of the mountains to the west is known as the Conger Range.  The Confusion Range is named for its "rugged isolation and confusing topography."

The highest peaks in the range are Conger Mountain , which is 7,713 feet tall, and King Top , which is 8,350 feet tall.

Geology 
The geology of the Confusion range is deformed Silurian to Permian limestones, dolomites, and shales.

Roads 
There are three main ways to travel through the Confusion Range:
Around the north end, from Callao, Utah to Sand Pass
On old Highway 6/50, on a dirt road through Cowboy Pass
On US Highway 6/US Highway 50, through Kings Canyon (Utah)

References 

Mountain ranges of Utah
Mountain ranges of Juab County, Utah
Mountain ranges of Millard County, Utah
Mountain ranges of the Great Basin